Kemezung (Dumbo, Dumbu, Dzumbo, Kumaju) is a Southern Bantoid (Eastern Beboid) language of Cameroon. According to Ethnologue, it's 85% lexically similar to Bebe.

Notes

References
Cox, Bruce. 2005. Notes on the Phonology of Kemezung.  ms. Yaoundé: SIL
Brye, Edward and Elizabeth Brye. 2004. "Intelligibility testing survey of Bebe and Kemezung and synthesis of sociolinguistic research of the Eastern Beboid cluster." SIL Electronic Survey Reports 2004-011: 18 p. http://www.sil.org/silesr/abstract.asp?ref=2004-011
 Blench, Roger, 2011. 'The membership and internal structure of Bantoid and the border with Bantu'. Bantu IV, Humboldt University, Berlin.

Beboid languages
Languages of Cameroon